Onappudava is a 1978 Indian Malayalam-language film, directed by K. G. George and produced by Carmel Johny. The film stars Sharada, Bahadoor, Adoor Bhasi and Sreelatha Namboothiri. The film has musical score by M. B. Sreenivasan.

Plot

Cast 
Sharada
Bahadoor
Adoor Bhasi
Sreelatha Namboothiri
Cochin Haneefa
Chandraji
Sreenivasan
Mallika Sukumaran
Pankajavalli
T. P. Madhavan

Soundtrack 
The music was composed by M. B. Sreenivasan with lyrics by O. N. V. Kurup.

References

External links 
 

1970s Malayalam-language films
1978 films
Films directed by K. G. George
Films scored by M. B. Sreenivasan